The 1996 U.S. Women's Open was the 51st U.S. Women's Open, held May 30 to June 2 at Pine Needles Lodge and Golf Club in Southern Pines, North Carolina.

Defending champion Annika Sörenstam retained the title, six strokes ahead of runner-up Kris Tschetter. It was the second of her ten major titles; her third came nearly five years later. ESPN and NBC Sports televised the tournament.

Sörenstam was the sixth of seven to win consecutive titles at the U.S. Women's Open, most recently accomplished by Karrie Webb in 2001, also at Pine Needles. The championship returned to the venue for a third time in 2007, won by Cristie Kerr.

This was the first women's major with a winner's share of $200,000 or more; the U.S. Women's Open became the tour's richest major this year, passing the LPGA Championship.

Past champions in the field

Made the cut

Source:

Missed the cut

Source:

Round summaries

First round
Thursday, May 30, 1996

Source:

Second round
Friday, May 31, 1996

Source:

Third round
Saturday, June 1, 1996

Source:

Final round
Sunday, June 2, 1996

Source:

References

External links
U.S. Women's Open - past champions - 1996

U.S. Women's Open
Golf in North Carolina
Sports competitions in North Carolina
U.S. Women's Open
U.S. Women's Open
U.S. Women's Open
U.S. Women's Open
U.S. Women's Open
Women's sports in North Carolina